Jurong East is a planning area and residential town situated in the West Region of Singapore. It borders Jurong West and Boon Lay to the west, Clementi to the east, Tengah and Bukit Batok to the north and Selat Jurong to the south. 

Jurong East is the 7th most populated planning area in the West Region. Jurong East, along with the entire Jurong area in general, is envisioned to be the country's second central business district (CBD) as part of the Jurong Lake District project.

History

The development of Jurong started in the 1970s when estates such as Boon Lay, Taman Jurong, Bukit Batok, Bukit Gombak, Hong Kah, Teban Gardens and Yuhua were built, mostly due to the resettlement of Hong Kah (present-day Tengah) and surrounding villages. Yuhua, Teban Gardens, Bukit Batok and Bukit Gombak formed Jurong East.

Subzones
There are 10 subzones in Jurong East.
 Jurong Port
 Penjuru Crescent
 Jurong River
 Teban Gardens
 Lakeside
 Jurong Gateway
 International Business Park
 Toh Guan
 Yuhua East
 Yuhua West

Politics
The Northern section is under Jurong GRC and Southern section under West Coast GRC. After the electoral boundaries were redrawn for the 2011 Singaporean general election, a portion of the Jurong GRC was carved out to form the Yuhua SMC.

Education
There are 3 Primary schools and 4 Secondary schools in Jurong East.
 Commonwealth Secondary School
 Crest Secondary School
 Fuhua Primary School (which Pandan Primary School merged into)
 Jurong Primary School
 Jurongville Secondary School
 Shuqun Secondary School
 Yuhua Primary School

Recreation

Sports
 Jurong East Sports and Recreation Centre

Leisure
 Jurong Lake Park
 Pandan Gardens Park Connector
 Jurong Park Connector
 Toh Guan Neighbourhood Park
 Pandan Gardens Leisure Park
 Pandan Reservoir Fitness Corner
 Jurong Country Club
 Hong Kah East Neighbourhood Park
 Yuhua Village Neighbourhood Park
Genting Hotel Jurong

Tourist attractions
There are 3 tourist attractions in Jurong East -
 Science Centre
 Snow City
 Chinese Garden

Transport

Roads
Jurong East is connected to the rest of Singapore with the Pan Island Expressway (PIE) and the Ayer Rajah Expressway (AYE). 
 Jurong Town Hall Road interconnects the two expressways with Boon Lay, Yuhua, Jurong Regional Centre, International Business Park, Jurong Lake and Teban Gardens.
 Toh Guan is connected to the PIE via Toh Guan Road, while Jurong Canal Road provides an alternative at Boon Lay for traffic to (Tuas) and from (Changi) the PIE. 
 From the AYE, arterial roads Jurong Pier Road, Jurong Port Road and Penjuru Road (along with Minor Arterial road Teban Gardens Crescent) carry the traffic to Jurong River, Penjuru Crescent and Jurong Port.
 Boon Lay Way and Jalan Buroh are the two other arterial roads in Jurong East, which provides inter-connectivity across the various subzones in the area.

Public transport

Mass Rapid Transit
Jurong East is served by 2 MRT stations: Jurong East and Chinese Garden.

Bus
Jurong East Bus Interchange started operations in 1985. It later moved to its first temporary site on 17 December 2011. All the bus services, except 51, 52, 105, 160, 197 & 506 were handed over to Tower Transit Singapore on 12 June 2016.

The former temporary interchange will move to another site on 6 December 2020, to make way for the construction of the Jurong Region Line and new transport hub by 2027. All bus services with the exception of service 78, 79, CW3 and CW4 will move there.

Economy
At Jurong Port, Jurong River, Penjuru Crescent, and parts of Toh Guan and Teban Gardens, there is land allocated for business activities.

Jurong Lake District
Consisting of Jurong Lake, Jurong Gateway, International Business Park and the southern section of Toh Guan, the Jurong Lake District is a prime regional centre serving as an commercial hub for business developments remote from the Central Area, to meet the various demands of businesses and provide employment opportunities closer to people staying in the West Region of Singapore.

International Business Park

Commercial

Shopping malls

Within the boundaries of Jurong Gateway and Toh Guan, there are 4 shopping malls: 
 IMM
 JCube
 JEM
 Westgate

Town Centre
The Town Centre of Jurong East is located at Jurong Regional Centre, presently known as Jurong Gateway subzone.

Jurong East Town Centre
Jurong Regional Library

References

Jurong East
Places in Singapore
West Region, Singapore
New towns in Singapore
New towns started in the 1970s

de:Jurong
pt:Jurong
simple:Jurong
tl:Jurong